The 1954 Nebraska gubernatorial election was held on November 2, 1954, and featured Mayor of Lincoln Victor E. Anderson, a Republican, defeating Democratic nominee, attorney William Ritchie.

Democratic primary

Candidates
Mabel Fossler
P. J. Heaton
William Ritchie, attorney
A. E. Swanson

Results

Republican primary

Candidates
Victor E. Anderson, Mayor of Lincoln and former member of the Nebraska Legislature
James L. Bourret
Clarence R. Bristol
Louis H. Hector
John McKernan
Frederick H. Wagener, Lancaster County Attorney
Arthur B. Walker

Results

General election

Results

References

Gubernatorial
1954
Nebraska
November 1954 events in the United States